Lachnorhiza is a genus of Cuban flowering plants in the daisy family.

 Species
 Lachnorhiza micrantha (Borhidi) Borhidi - Pinar del Río Province in Cuba
 Lachnorhiza piloselloides A.Rich. - Isla de la Juventud in Cuba

References

Vernonieae
Asteraceae genera
Endemic flora of Cuba